Jan de Boer (born 29 June 1967, in Doniawerstal) is a Dutch theoretical physicist specializing in string theory. 
After a double master's degree in mathematics and physics at the University of Groningen, De Boer obtained his PhD from Utrecht University with the dissertation Extended conformal symmetry in non-critical string theory. Since 2000 he has been professor of theoretical physics at the University of Amsterdam.

From 1946 to 1981 an unrelated Jan de Boer (1911–2010) was professor of theoretical physics at the same department of the University of Amsterdam. His specialty was thermodynamics.

Awards and fellowships 
 1984, First place and gold medal, 15th International Physics Olympiad
 1984, Silver medal, 28th International Mathematics Olympiad
 1995–1996, James Simons Fellowship, Stony Brook University
 1996–1998, Miller Fellowship, Berkeley

References 

1967 births
Living people
Dutch string theorists
Academic staff of the University of Amsterdam
University of Groningen alumni
Utrecht University alumni
People from Skarsterlân